Grzymały may refer to:

Grzymały, Masovian Voivodeship (east-central Poland)
Grzymały, Łomża County in Podlaskie Voivodeship (north-east Poland)
Grzymały, Zambrów County in Podlaskie Voivodeship (north-east Poland)